The 2022 Alsco Uniforms 250 was the 17th stock car race of the 2022 NASCAR Xfinity Series, and the second iteration of the event. The race was held on Saturday, July 9, 2022, in Hampton, Georgia at Atlanta Motor Speedway, a  permanent tri-oval racetrack. The race took it's scheduled 163 laps to complete. Austin Hill, driving for Richard Childress Racing, held off Josh Berry on the final few laps, and earned his second career NASCAR Xfinity Series win, along with his second of the season. Hill would mostly dominate the race as well, leading 73 laps. To fill out the podium, Ryan Truex, driving for Joe Gibbs Racing, would finish in 3rd, respectively.

Background 
Atlanta Motor Speedway (formerly known Atlanta International Raceway from 1960 to 1990) is a 1.54-mile entertainment facility in Hampton, Georgia, United States, 20 miles (32 km) south of Atlanta. It has annually hosted NASCAR Cup Series stock car races since its inauguration in 1960.

The venue was bought by Speedway Motorsports in 1990. In 1994, 46 condominiums were built over the northeastern side of the track. In 1997, to standardize the track with Speedway Motorsports' other two intermediate ovals, the entire track was almost completely rebuilt. The project made the track one of the fastest on the NASCAR circuit. In July 2021 NASCAR announced that the track would be reprofiled for the 2022 season to have 28 degrees (previously 24 degrees) of banking and would be narrowed from 55 to 40 feet which makes racing at the track similar to restrictor plate superspeedways. Despite the reprofiling being criticized by drivers, construction began in August 2021 and wrapped up in December 2021. The track has seating capacity of 71,000 to 125,000 people depending on the tracks configuration.

Entry list

Qualifying 
Qualifying was scheduled to be held on Saturday, July 9, at 9:30 AM EST. Since Atlanta Motor Speedway is an oval track, the qualifying system used is a single-car, single-lap system with only one round. Whoever sets the fastest time in the round wins the pole.

Due to inclement weather, qualifying would be cancelled. The starting lineup would be determined by a performance-based metric system. As a result, Ty Gibbs, driving for Joe Gibbs Racing, would take the pole.

Race results 
Stage 1 Laps: 40

Stage 2 Laps: 40

Stage 3 Laps: 83

Standings after the race 

Drivers' Championship standings

Note: Only the first 12 positions are included for the driver standings.

References 

2022 NASCAR Xfinity Series
NASCAR races at Atlanta Motor Speedway
Alsco Uniforms 250
2022 in sports in Georgia (U.S. state)